Chobielin  is a village in the administrative district of Gmina Szubin, within Nakło County, Kuyavian-Pomeranian Voivodeship, in north-central Poland.

The village has a population of 92. Poland's erstwhile foreign minister, Radoslaw Sikorski, owns a manor in the village.

References

Chobielin